Sir Edmund Charles Wyldbore-Smith (15 January 1877 - 18 October 1938) was a British civil servant, diplomat, and businessman.

Biography
Smith was the son of Reverend Francis Smith (1841-1877), who was the fourth son of the second Smith-Marriott Baronet.  His grandfather was Sir John Wyldbore Smith (1770-1852).

In 1901, he married Evadne Maude Kellet; and the couple had two daughter—Monica Elizabeth and Jocelin Evadne.

Career
In the early 1900s, Wyldbore-Smith served in the Foreign Office beginning his service as Vice-Consul at Tangiers in 1903.  Four years later he was  appointed Vice-Consul in Canea (modern Chania), Crete. In January 1910 he transferred to the Board of Trade where he was employed as Officer-in-Charge of Commercial Enquiries in its recently established Exhibitions Branch; in effect he acted as deputy to the Director of the Branch, Ulick Fitzgerald Wintour. During the First World War, Smith was Director of the British Executive Staff of the Commission Internationale de Ravitaillement, which was the international commission for the purchase of supplies for the Allies.

Wyldbore-Smith resignation from the Civil Service in 1919 opened the way for a career in business.  He was appointed chairman of Thomas Cook (both the travel agency and the banking firm), succeeding Frank Cook, who was the grandson of the company's founder.

Wyldbore-Smith served as vice-president of the Compagnie Internationale des Wagons-Lits (International Sleeping-Car Company) and vice-president of the Federation of British Industries.  He also served as a director of the Suez Canal Company.

Honours
In 1906, he was elected to the Royal Statistical Society.

Smith was awarded decorations of seven countries, including:
 Knight Bachelor (United Kingdom)
 Légion d'Honneur (France)
 Order of Leopold (Belgium)
 Order of the Crown of Italy, 1918 (Italy).
 Order of George I, 1920 (Greece).
 Order of the Sacred Treasure, 1920 (Japan).
 Order of the Crown of Romania, 1921.

Notes

References
 Burke, Edmund. (1839).  The Annual Register of World Events: A Review of the Year, vol. 80. London: Longmans, Green.  OCLC 4982221
 Croslegh, Charles. (1904).  Descent and alliances of Croslegh: or Crossle, or Crossley, of Scaitcliffe; and Coddington of Oldbridge; and Evans, of Eyton hall. Priv. print., The De La More Press. 
 Mosley, Charles. (1999).  Burke's Peerage and Baronetage (106th ed.). Crans, Switzerland: Burke's Peerage (Genealogical Books) Ltd. 

1877 births
1938 deaths
British diplomats
British businesspeople
Recipients of the Order of George I
Recipients of the Legion of Honour
Knights Bachelor